QIWI plc is a Russian company that provides payment and financial services in Russia and CIS countries. The group includes QIWI payment system, QIWI Bank, CONTACT money transfer system, Factoring PLUS, Flocktory, and QPlatform. The company has representative offices in three countries.

The payment network has more than 16.6 million wallets and virtual cards, as well as almost 106 thousand terminals and payment points.

History 
QIWI Group was founded by Sergey Solonin, Boris Kim and Andrey Romanenko in 2007. In November 2012, Visa and QIWI signed a global partnership agreement, under which QIWI Wallet was transformed into a co-branded product Visa QIWI Wallet.

In 2013, QIWI went public on the NASDAQ, the shares were traded at $17 per share. 

In July 2015, QIWI Group became 100% shareholder of CONTACT money transfer system. In June 2017 the co-founder of the payment service QIWI Andrei Romanenko left the management of the company and sold the stake he owned. 

In October 2017, QIWI bought the rights to the brand and software of the banking services Rocketbank and "Tochka" from Otkritie Bank. In June 2018, Otkritie Bank, QIWI Group and Tochka announced the signing of a cooperation agreement and the creation of the joint venture Tochka JSC, which would launch a new stage in the development of the financial services market for entrepreneurs in Russia. In 2021, QIWI sold its stake in the joint venture to Otkritie Bank, the transaction amounted to 4.95 billion rubles.  In 2021, Andrey Protopopov, who previously headed the Payment Segment, was appointed to the position of CEO.

In August 2021, in accordance with the order of the President of Russia, the creditor Mobile Card, not Qiwi, was chosen as the exclusive center for accounting for the transfer of bets from the bookmakers. Olga Zhuravskaya (16,5%), the wife of co-founder of betting company Liga Stavok, and Igor Avdeev (11,25%) are featuring among other minority shareholders of Mobile Card. By the end of September 2021, the process of replacing the relevant activities of operators with a single regulator for accounting rates in bookmakers will be completed. Due to the consolidation of accounting on the chosen one and exclusive operator, deprivation of Qiwi functions of accounting and Qiwi`s forecasts of the reduction of its revenue, the price of shares of Qiwi has fallen by 6%. In September 2021, Qiwi`s CEO Andrey Protopopov announced that the company will continue to deal with betting providers via new Unified Center for Accounting of Bet money Transfers, which will consolidate two current centers, Qiwi Bank and Mobilnaya Karta.

In May 2022, the hacking group Network Battalion 65 (NB65) claimed to have shutdown servers, "shutdown your Hyper-V clusters and encrypted the images", "encrypted all your SQL databases", "smoked ~10.5TB of backups" and ex-filtrated 12.5 million of their clients' credit card information.

B2B Services 
 QIWI offers internet-acquiring services and internet-banking.  
 The company has developed payment services based on an open API that allow to set up mass payments, including to the self-employed. 
 QIWI issues physical and virtual cards that can be used to set up mass payments to customers and partners. 
 In 2019, QIWI launched the "Taxiaggregator" service, designed specifically for taxi fleets. In the same year, the company developed a financial service for scrap haulers, which made it possible to transfer settlements into a cashless form.

References

Online companies of Cyprus
Electronic funds transfer
Financial services companies established in 2007
Payment service providers
Financial technology companies
Companies listed on the Moscow Exchange
Companies based in Nicosia
Companies listed on the Nasdaq